Nadine Fourcade (25 February 1963 – 19 April 2011) was a French athlete, who specialized in the Long jump.

Biography  
She won three French National Outdoor championship titles  in 1986,  1987 and 1988, and won two other titles indoors in  1985  and  1986 .  On May 4, 1985, at Montgeron, she established a new French Long Jump record with a jump of 6.79m, improving by 17 cm the former best national jump owned by Jackie Curtet.

Prizes  
 French Championships in Athletics   :  
 Outdoors   : Winner of the long jump 1986,  1987 and 1988   
 Indoors           : Winner of the long jump in 1985 and 1986.

Records

Notes and references

External links  
 

1963 births
2011 deaths
French female long jumpers
Sportspeople from Reims
20th-century French women